This is a list of films produced by Brooksfilms, the studio founded by Oscar-winning filmmaker Mel Brooks.

Productions

Accolades

Awards and nominations

References 

Brooksfilms
Films produced by Mel Brooks